Vítor Hugo Fernandes Moreira  (born 30 November 1982) is a Portuguese futsal player who plays as a goalkeeper for Braga/AAUM and the Portugal national team.

Honours

Club
Benfica
Liga Portuguesa: 2011–12
Taça de Portugal: 2011–12
Supertaça de Portugal: 2011

International
Portugal
UEFA Futsal Championship: 2018
FIFA Futsal World Cup: 2021

Orders
  Commander of the Order of Prince Henry
  Commander of the Order of Merit

References

External links

1982 births
Living people
Sportspeople from Porto
Futsal goalkeepers
Portuguese men's futsal players
S.L. Benfica futsal players